This is an incomplete list of books about al-Qaeda.

 
 
 
 
 
 
 
 
 
 
 
 
 
 
 
 
 
 
 
 
 
 
 
 

 
 
 
 
 
 

 
 
 
 Rubin, Barnett R.. The Fragmentation of Afghanistan: state formation and collapse in the international system. Pakistan, Yale University Press, 1995.
 
 
 
 
 

 
 
 

 
Bibliographies on terrorism